Beijing Love Story may refer to:

 Beijing Love Story (TV series), a 2012 Chinese television series
 Beijing Love Story (film), a 2014 Chinese romance film